The 2013–14 Utah Jazz season was the franchise's fortieth season in the National Basketball Association (NBA), and 35th season in Salt Lake City. The season ended with the Jazz finishing last in their respective division and conference, winning only twenty-five games for their worst record since the 24–58 1979–80 Jazz, who were playing the franchise's first season in Utah. The season also concluded with the release of coach Tyrone Corbin.

Pre-season

|- style="background:#bfb;"
| 1
| October 8
| Golden State
| 
| John Lucas III (16)
| Derrick Favors (14)
| Gordon Hayward (8)
| EnergySolutions Arena19,025
| 1–0
|- style="background:#fcc;"
| 2
| October 11
| @ Portland
| 
| Gordon Hayward (20)
| Derrick Favors (9)
| Trey Burke (5)
| CenturyLink Arena6,268
| 1–1
|- style="background:#fcc;"
| 3
| October 12
| L.A. Clippers
| 
| Richard Jefferson (13)
| Richard Jefferson (8)
| Gordon Hayward (5)
| EnergySolutions Arena17,924
| 1–2
|- style="background:#fcc;"
| 4
| October 16
| Portland
| 
| Enes Kanter (23)
| Derrick Favors (17)
| Gordon Hayward (7)
| EnergySolutions Arena19,127
| 1–3
|- style="background:#fcc;"
| 5
| October 20
| @ Oklahoma City
| 
| Gordon Hayward (18)
| Derrick Favors (8)
| John Lucas III (5)
| Chesapeake Energy Arena18,203
| 1–4
|- style="background:#fcc;"
| 6
| October 22
| @ L.A. Lakers
| 
| Brian Cook (18)
| Derrick Favors (13)
| Alec Burks (6)
| Staples Center17,186
| 1–5
|- style="background:#fcc;"
| 7
| October 23
| @ L.A. Clippers
| 
| Derrick Favors (24)
| Derrick Favors (17)
| Gordon Hayward (6)
| Staples Center13,611
| 1–6
|- style="background:#fcc;"
| 8
| October 25
| @ L.A. Lakers
| 
| Hayward & Burks (18)
| Rudy Gobert (9)
| Lester Hudson (6)
| Honda Center14,808
| 1–7

Roster

Regular season

Standings

Game log

|- style="background:#fcc;"
| 1
| October 30
| Oklahoma City
| 
| Alec Burks (24)
| Enes Kanter (10)
| Alec Burks (6)
| EnergySolutions Arena19,911
| 0–1

|- style="background:#fcc;"
| 2
| November 1
| @ Phoenix
| 
| Enes Kanter (20)
| Derrick Favors (17)
| Gordon Hayward (8)
| US Airways Center14,662
| 0–2
|- style="background:#fcc;"
| 3
| November 2
| Houston
| 
| Richard Jefferson (18)
| Enes Kanter (8)
| John Lucas III (4)
| EnergySolutions Arena19,498
| 0–3
|- style="background:#fcc;"
| 4
| November 5
| @ Brooklyn
| 
| Gordon Hayward (22)
| Rudy Gobert (11)
| Hayward & Burks (4)
| Barclays Center17,732
| 0–4
|- style="background:#fcc;"
| 5
| November 6
| @ Boston
| 
| Gordon Hayward (28)
| Derrick Favors (14)
| Gordon Hayward (5)
| TD Garden17,130
| 0–5
|- style="background:#fcc;"
| 6
| November 8
| @ Chicago
| 
| Gordon Hayward (15)
| Rudy Gobert (12)
| Gordon Hayward (5)
| United Center21,946
| 0–6
|- style="background:#fcc;"
| 7
| November 9
| @ Toronto
| 
| Gordon Hayward (24)
| Favors, Hayward, Gobert (7)
| Hayward, Tinsley, Burks (4)
| Air Canada Centre17,211
| 0–7
|- style="background:#fcc;"
| 8
| November 11
| Denver
| 
| Gordon Hayward (22)
| Derrick Favors (13)
| Jamaal Tinsley (3)
| EnergySolutions Arena16,866
| 0–8
|- style="background:#cfc;"
| 9
| November 13
| New Orleans
| 
| Gordon Hayward (27)
| Derrick Favors (12)
| Gordon Hayward (10)
| EnergySolutions Arena16,717
| 1–8
|- style="background:#fcc;"
| 10
| November 15
| San Antonio
| 
| Derrick Favors (20)
| Derrick Favors (18)
| Alec Burks (4)
| EnergySolutions Arena17,530
| 1–9
|- style="background:#fcc;"
| 11
| November 16
| @ Golden State
| 
| Derrick Favors (17)
| Derrick Favors (7)
| Richard Jefferson (5)
| Oracle Arena19,596
| 1–10
|- style="background:#fcc;"
| 12
| November 18
| Golden State
| 
| Gordon Hayward (18)
| Marvin Williams (8)
| Diante Garrett (5)
| EnergySolutions Arena16,051
| 1–11
|- style="background:#fcc;"
| 13
| November 20
| @ New Orleans
| 
| Enes Kanter (19)
| Derrick Favors (11)
| Gordon Hayward (11)
| New Orleans Arena13,203
| 1–12
|- style="background:#fcc;"
| 14
| November 22
| @ Dallas
| 
| Marvin Williams (19)
| Derrick Favors (8)
| Diante Garrett (8)
| American Airlines Center19,781
| 1–13
|- style="background:#fcc;"
| 15
| November 24
| @ Oklahoma City
| 
| Enes Kanter (10)
| Derrick Favors (9)
| Alec Burks (4)
| Chesapeake Energy Arena18,203
| 1–14
|- style="background:#cfc;"
| 16
| November 25
| Chicago
| 
| Marvin Williams (17)
| Williams & Gobert (9)
| Gordon Hayward (12)
| EnergySolutions Arena18,936
| 2–14
|- style="background:#fcc;"
| 17
| November 29
| Phoenix
| 
| Marvin Williams (18)
| Marvin Williams (7)
| Gordon Hayward (6)
| EnergySolutions Arena18,435
| 2-15
|- style="background:#cfc;"
| 18
| November 30
| @ Phoenix
| 
| Trey Burke (20)
| Derrick Favors (8)
| Trey Burke (5)
| US Airways Center 12,957
| 3–15

|- style="background:#cfc;"
| 19
| December 2
| Houston
| 
| Gordon Hayward (29)
| Derrick Favors (13)
| Trey Burke (6)
| EnergySolutions Arena15,801
| 4–15
|- style="background:#fcc;"
| 20
| December 4
| Indiana
| 
| Derrick Favors (22)
| Derrick Favors (13)
| Trey Burke (9)
| EnergySolutions Arena15,519
| 4–16
|- style="background:#fcc;"
| 21
| December 6
| @ Portland
| 
| Alec Burks (16)
| Jeremy Evans (9)
| Diante Garrett (4)
| Moda Center19,833
| 4–17
|- style="background:#fcc;"
| 22
| December 7
| Sacramento
| 
| Gordon Hayward (22)
| Trey Burke (10)
| Trey Burke (7)
| EnergySolutions Arena16,500
| 4–18
|- style="background:#fcc;"
| 23
| December 9
| Portland
| 
| Alec Burks (20)
| Jeremy Evans (8)
| Alec Burks (5)
| EnergySolutions Arena17,555
| 4–19
|- style="background:#cfc;"
| 24
| December 11
| @ Sacramento
| 
| Richard Jefferson (20)
| Derrick Favors (7)
| Alec Burks (9)
| Sleep Train Arena15,198
| 5–19
|- style="background:#cfc;"
| 25
| December 13
| @ Denver
| 
| Gordon Hayward (30)
| Gordon Hayward (13)
| Trey Burke (10)
| Pepsi Center15,616
| 6–19
|- style="background:#fcc;"
| 26
| December 14
| San Antonio
| 
| Trey Burke (20)
| Jeremy Evans (11)
| Gordon Hayward (5)
| EnergySolutions Arena19,330
| 6–20
|- style="background:#fcc;"
| 27
| December 16
| @ Miami
| 
| Alec Burks (31)
| Enes Kanter (8)
| Alec Burks (7)
| American Airlines Arena19,600
| 6–21
|- style="background:#cfc;"
| 28
| December 18
| @ Orlando
| 
| Trey Burke (30)
| Derrick Favors (11)
| Trey Burke (8)
| Amway Center15,574
| 7–21
|- style="background:#fcc;"
| 29
| December 20
| @ Atlanta
| 
| Alec Burks (13)
| Enes Kanter (13)
| Alec Burks (4)
| Philips Arena11,150
| 7–22
|- style="background:#cfc;"
| 30
| December 21
| @ Charlotte
| 
| Trey Burke (20)
| Gordon Hayward (10)
| Trey Burke (4)
| Time Warner Cable Arena18,078
| 8–22
|- style="background:#fcc;"
| 31
| December 23
| @ Memphis
| 
| Richard Jefferson (18)
| Gordon Hayward (11)
| Gordon Hayward (9)
| FedExForum16,665
| 8–23
|- style="background:#cfc;"
| 32
| December 27
| L.A. Lakers
| 
| Gordon Hayward (24)
| Derrick Favors (14)
| Gordon Hayward (9)
| EnergySolutions Arena19,911
| 9-23
|- style="background:#fcc;"
| 33
| December 28
| @ L.A. Clippers
| 
| Enes Kanter (17)
| Enes Kanter (12)
| Gordon Hayward (7)
| Staples Center19,278
| 9-24
|- style="background:#cfc;"
| 34
| December 30
| Charlotte
| 
| Trey Burke (21)
| Marvin Williams (10)
| Trey Burke, Gordon Hayward (5)
| EnergySolutions Arena19,125
| 10-24

|- style="background:#cfc;"
| 35
| January 2
| Milwaukee
| 
| Gordon Hayward (22)
| Derrick Favors (11)
| Trey Burke (4)
| EnergySolutions Arena16,012
| 11-24
|- style="background:#fcc;"
| 36
| January 3
| @ L.A. Lakers
| 
| Gordon Hayward (22)
| Enes Kanter (10)
| Trey Burke (9)
| Staples Center18,997
| 11-25
|- style="background:#cfc;"
| 37
| January 7
| Oklahoma City
| 
| Gordon Hayward (37)
| Gordon Hayward (11)
| Gordon Hayward (7)
| EnergySolutions Arena18,547
| 12-25
|- style="background:#fcc;"
| 38
| January 10
| Cleveland
| 
| Richard Jefferson (18)
| Enes Kanter (10)
| Trey Burke (6)
| EnergySolutions Arena18,480
| 12-26
|- style="background:#cfc;"
| 39
| January 13
| Denver
| 
| Alec Burks (34)
| Derrick Favors (15)
| Trey Burke (8)
| EnergySolutions Arena17,232
| 13-26
|- style="background:#fcc;"
| 40
| January 15
| @ San Antonio
| 
| Enes Kanter (25)
| Derrick Favors (12)
| Trey Burke (11)
| AT&T Center17,917
| 13-27
|- style="background:#cfc;"
| 41
| January 17
| @ Detroit
| 
| Trey Burke (20)
| Derrick Favors (11)
| Trey Burke (12)
| Palace of Auburn Hills18,528
| 14-27
|- style="background:#fcc;"
| 42
| January 18
| @ Minnesota
| 
| Alec Burks (18)
| Derrick Favors & Jeremy Evans (10)
| Alec Burks (4)
| Target Center17,111
| 14-28
|- style="background:#fcc;"
| 43
| January 21
| Minnesota
| 
| Gordon Hayward (27)
| Enes Kanter & Rudy Gobert (6)
| Gordon Hayward & Trey Burke (5)
| EnergySolutions Arena16,387
| 14-29
|- style="background:#cfc;"
| 44
| January 25
| Washington
| 
| Enes Kanter (24)
| Derrick Favors (14)
| Trey Burke (8)
| EnergySolutions Arena17,754
|  15-29
|- style="background:#cfc;"
| 45
| January 27
| Sacramento
| 
| Derrick Favors (17)
| Derrick Favors (12)
| Gordon Hayward (6)
| EnergySolutions Arena16,663
|  16-29
|- style="background:#fcc;"
| 46
| January 31
| Golden State
| 
| Alec Burks (26)
| Gordon Hayward (9)
| Trey Burke (6)
| EnergySolutions Arena19,911
|  16-30

|- style="background:#fcc;"
| 47
| February 1
| @ L.A. Clippers
| 
| Enes Kanter (23)
| Enes Kanter (14)
| Trey Burke & Marvin Williams (5)
| Staples Center19,060
| 16-31
|- style="background:#fcc;"
| 48
| February 3
| Toronto
| 
| Marvin Williams (23)
| Marvin Williams & Rudy Gobert (8)
| Burke & Hayward (3)
| EnergySolutions Arena17,139
| 16-32
|- style="background:#fcc;"
| 49
| February 7
| @ Dallas
| 
| Marvin Williams (21)
| Alec Burks (7)
| Burke & Hayward (5)
| American Airlines Center19,928
| 16-33
|- style="background:#cfc;"
| 50
| February 8
| Miami
| 
| Marvin Williams (23)
| Gordon Hayward (9)
| Gordon Hayward (11)
| EnergySolutions Arena19,911
| 17-33
|- style="background:#cfc;"
| 51
| February 11
| @ L.A. Lakers
| 
| Alec Burks (24)
| Enes Kanter (11)
| Trey Burke (8)
| Staples Center18,209
| 18-33
|- style="background:#cfc;"
| 52
| February 12
| Philadelphia
| 
| Alec Burks (26)
| Marvin Williams (14)
| Gordon Hayward (7)
| EnergySolutions Arena19,368
| 19-33
|- align="center"
|colspan="9" bgcolor="#bbcaff"|All-Star Break
|- style="background:#fcc;"
| 53
| February 19
| Brooklyn
| 
| Alec Burks (23)
| Jeremy Evans (13)
| Trey Burke (10)
| EnergySolutions Arena17,386
| 19-34
|- style="background:#fcc;"
| 54
| February 21
| @ Portland
| 
| Enes Kanter (25)
| Enes Kanter (10)
| Burke & Hayward (7)
| Moda Center19,998
| 19-35
|- style="background:#fcc;"
| 55
| February 22
| Minnesota
| 
| Enes Kanter (25)
| Rudy Gobert (9)
| Trey Burke (6)
| EnergySolutions Arena19,323
| 19-36
|- style="background:#cfc;"
| 56
| February 24
| Boston
| 
| Alec Burks (21)
| Marvin Williams (7)
| Gordon Hayward (10)
| EnergySolutions Arena17,130
| 20-36
|- style="background:#cfc;"
| 57
| February 26
| Phoenix
| 
| Hayward & Jefferson (17)
| Gordon Hayward (10)
| Gordon Hayward (9)
| EnergySolutions Arena19,639
| 21-36
|- style="background:#fcc;"
| 58
| February 28
| @ Cleveland
| 
| Gordon Hayward (18)
| Gordon Hayward (7)
| Gordon Hayward (7)
| Quicken Loans Arena18,601
| 21-37

|- style="background:#fcc;"
| 59
| March 2
| @ Indiana
| 
| Gordon Hayward (21)
| Derrick Favors (10)
| Alec Burks (7)
| Bankers Life Fieldhouse18,165
| 21–38
|- style="background:#fcc;"
| 60
| March 3
| @ Milwaukee
| 
| Enes Kanter (27)
| Enes Kanter (14)
| Trey Burke (5)
| BMO Harris Bradley Center10,022
| 21–39
|- style="background:#fcc;"
| 61
| March 5
| @ Washington
| 
| Alec Burks (19)
| Marvin Williams (6)
| Gordon Hayward (6)
| Verizon Center13,911
| 21–40
|- style="background:#fcc;"
| 62
| March 7
| @ New York
| 
| Hayward & Burks (18)
| Favors & Kanter (10)
| Gordon Hayward (5)
| Madison Square Garden19,812
| 21–41
|- style="background:#cfc;"
| 63
| March 8
| @ Philadelphia
| 
| Gordon Hayward (22)
| Derrick Favors (14)
| Hayward & Burke (8)
| Wells Fargo Center13,569
| 22–41
|- style="background:#fcc;"
| 64
| March 10
| Atlanta
| 
| Trey Burke (23)
| Favors & Kanter (9)
| Gordon Hayward (7)
| EnergySolutions Arena17,774
| 22–42
|- style="background:#fcc;"
| 65
| March 12
| Dallas
| 
| Trey Burke (20)
| Enes Kanter (11)
| Trey Burke (8)
| EnergySolutions Arena17,982
| 22–43
|- style="background:#fcc;"
| 66
| March 14
| L.A. Clippers
| 
| Favors & Burke (18)
| Enes Kanter (15)
| Gordon Hayward (10)
| EnergySolutions Arena19,381
| 22–44
|- style="background:#fcc;"
| 67
| March 16
| @ San Antonio
| 
| Derrick Favors (28)
| Enes Kanter (11)
| Gordon Hayward (6)
| AT&T Center18,242
| 22–45
|- style="background:#fcc;"
| 68
| March 17
| @ Houston
| 
| Favors & Burks (15)
| Enes Kanter (9)
| Trey Burke (5)
| Toyota Center18,156
| 22–46
|- style="background:#fcc;"
| 69
| March 19
| @ Memphis
| 
| Hayward, Burke & Burks (16)
| Enes Kanter (9)
| Trey Burke (5)
| FedExForum17,011
| 22–47
|- style="background:#cfc;"
| 70
| March 22
| Orlando
| 
| Richard Jefferson (21)
| Derrick Favors (12)
| Gordon Hayward (6)
| EnergySolutions Arena19,228
| 23–47
|- style="background:#fcc;"
| 71
| March 24
| Detroit
| 
| Gordon Hayward (32)
| Derrick Favors (9)
| Gordon Hayward (6)
| EnergySolutions Arena17,595
| 23–48
|- style="background:#fcc;"
| 72
| March 26
| Memphis
| 
| Derrick Favors (22)
| Enes Kanter (15)
| Trey Burke (10)
| EnergySolutions Arena19,081
| 23–49
|- style="background:#fcc;"
| 73
| March 28
| @ New Orleans
| 
| Gordon Hayward (21)
| Derrick Favors (11)
| Gordon Hayward (7)
| Smoothie King Center17,699
| 23–50
|- style="background:#fcc;"
| 74
| March 30
| @ Oklahoma City
| 
| Enes Kanter (18)
| Derrick Favors (13)
| Gordon Hayward (9)
| Chesapeake Energy Arena18,203
| 23–51
|- style="background:#fcc;"
| 75
| March 31
| New York
| 
| Gordon Hayward (18)
| Derrick Favors (13)
| Alec Burks (4)
| EnergySolutions Arena18,653
| 23–52

|- style="background:#cfc;"
| 76
| April 4
| New Orleans
| 
| Hayward & Burks (21)
| Derrick Favors (9)
| Alec Burks (8)
| EnergySolutions Arena19,681
| 24–52
|- style="background:#fcc;"
| 77
| April 6
| @ Golden State
| 
| Burke & Burks (24)
| Enes Kanter (12)
| Trey Burke (15)
| Oracle Arena19,596
| 24–53
|- style="background:#fcc;"
| 78
| April 8
| Dallas
| 
| Derrick Favors (19)
| Enes Kanter (19)
| Burke & Hayward (5)
| EnergySolutions Arena18,102
| 24–54
|- style="background:#fcc;"
| 79
| April 11
| Portland
| 
| Derrick Favors (23)
| Enes Kanter (14)
| Trey Burke (8)
| EnergySolutions Arena19,248
| 24–55
|- style="background:#fcc;"
| 80
| April 12
| @ Denver
| 
| Gordon Hayward (32)
| Enes Kanter (13)
| Trey Burke (11)
| Pepsi Center18,832
| 24–56
|- style="background:#fcc;"
| 81
| April 14
| L.A. Lakers
| 
| Alec Burks (22)
| Enes Kanter (12)
| Trey Burke (7)
| EnergySolutions Arena19,911
| 24–57
|- style="background:#cfc;"
| 82
| April 16
| @ Minnesota
| 
| Trey Burke (32)
| Derrick Favors (12)
| Burke & Hayward (9)
| Target Center14,155
| 25-57

Utah
Utah Jazz seasons
Utah
Utah